Miguel Antonio Smith Irisarri (29 September 1832 – 24 May 1877) was a Chilean landscape painter, engraver, caricaturist and art teacher.

Biography
His father, Jorge, was a native of Scotland and served as the consul in Santiago. His mother, Carmen, was the daughter of independence leader Antonio José de Irisarri and the sister of poet Hermógenes Irisarri. His family wanted him to be a lawyer. With his own money, he purchased brushes and paints, but they were thrown away.

He continued to insist so vehemently that, in 1849, his family gave in and allowed him to study at the new Academy of Painting (Santiago, Chile), founded by President Manuel Bulnes. His first teacher there was the Director, an Italian-born artist named Alejandro Ciccarelli, who worked to instil the Academic style in his students. Smith wanted to paint landscapes instead of mythological subjects, but Ciccarelli was adamant in his opposition. In 1851, thoroughly frustrated, Smith left the school to paint on his own. 

A year later, unsuccessful, he enlisted in a squadron of mounted grenadiers. He was stationed in Chillán, where he got married and abandoned his military career at the end of his five-year enlistment. On his return to Santiago, he became an employee of a savings bank managed by a former classmate of his, who would later become a well-known diplomat.

After only a year, he quit and became an illustrator for the political daily El Correo Literario, which was critical of the Conservative Republic. As might be expected, there was much official opposition. President Manuel Montt called on them to stop publishing "esos monos groseros" (those crude monkeys). After less than a year of operation, they had to close up shop, at least temporarily.

Time abroad

The failure of the Revolution of 1859 forced him to emigrate. He decided to go to France and, after a short time, became reasonably successful. However, the Bohemian lifestyle he had adopted caused him to squander his money, so he had to go to the United States to seek financial assistance from his grandfather, Antonio José, who at that time was a diplomat in New York. He then went to Italy, where he spent a year working with the landscape painter Carlo Marco. After that, he decided to return to Chile, despite the dangers involved in sea travel during the Chincha Islands War.

In 1866, following a difficult six-month voyage, he landed at San Antonio and joined a group of firefighters from Santiago, although he did not remain with them for long. Serious cultural reforms were sweeping the country, but he was amazed to see how little had changed at the Academy. That is, Ciccarelli was still in charge, so Smith established his own teaching workshop. In 1869, Ciccarelli was replaced by Ernst Kirchbach, a German painter who was more amenable to Smith, and they began sharing students. Some of his best-known students include Alfredo Valenzuela Puelma, Pedro Lira, Alberto Orrego Luco, Onofre Jarpa and Cosme San Martín.

Although an excellent teacher, he was very disorganized, painting when the mood struck him. As a result, many of his works were done quickly or left unfinished. His many imitators often make it difficult to assign authorship with certainty. The majority of his paintings are in private collections.

Landscapes

References

Further reading
 Arturo Blanco, Antonio Smith, Pintor de Paisajes y Caricaturista Chileno. Santiago: Instituto de Extensión de Artes Plásticas de la Universidad de Chile, 1954.
 Vicente Grez, Antonio Smith (Historia del Paisaje en Chile), La ilustración editorial en Chile, 1882 (Republished 1910?)

External links

Posthumous portrait of Antonio Smith by Manuel Thomson Ortiz (1875-1953) @ SurDoc
Revista Topaze "Political Cartooning in Chile"

1832 births
1877 deaths
Landscape painters
People from Santiago
Chilean cartoonists
19th-century Chilean painters
19th-century Chilean male artists
Chilean male artists
Chilean male painters
Male painters
Academy of Painting (Santiago, Chile) alumni